The Burma Railway, also known as the Siam–Burma Railway, Thai–Burma Railway and similar names, or as the Death Railway, is a  railway between Ban Pong, Thailand and Thanbyuzayat, Burma (now called Myanmar). It was built from 1940 to 1943 by civilian laborers impressed or recruited by the Japanese and prisoners of war taken by the Japanese, to supply troops and weapons in the Burma campaign of World War II. It completed the rail link between Bangkok, Thailand, and Rangoon, Burma. The name used by the Japanese Government was Tai–Men Rensetsu Tetsudō, which means Thailand-Burma-Link-Railway.

Between 180,000 and 250,000 Southeast Asian civilians and over 60,000 Allied prisoners of war were subjected to forced labour during its construction. Around 90,000 civilians died, as did more than 12,000 Allied prisoners.

Most of the railway was dismantled shortly after the war. Only the first  of the line in Thailand remained, with trains still running as far north as Nam Tok.

History 

A railway route between Burma and Thailand, crossing Three Pagodas Pass and following the valley of the Khwae Noi river in Thailand, had been surveyed by the British government of Burma as early as 1885, but the proposed course of the line – through hilly jungle terrain divided by many rivers – was considered too difficult to undertake.

Thailand was a neutral country at the onset of World War II. On 8 December 1941, Japan invaded Thailand which quickly surrendered. Thailand was forced to accept an alliance, and was used as a staging point for the attack on Singapore.

In early 1942, Japanese forces invaded Burma and seized control of the colony from the United Kingdom. To supply their forces in Burma, the Japanese depended upon the sea, bringing supplies and troops to Burma around the Malay peninsula and through the Strait of Malacca and the Andaman Sea. This route was vulnerable to attack by Allied submarines, especially after the Japanese defeat at the Battle of Midway in June 1942. To avoid a hazardous  sea journey around the Malay peninsula, a railway from Bangkok to Rangoon seemed a feasible alternative. The Japanese began this project in June 1942.

The project aimed to connect Ban Pong in Thailand with Thanbyuzayat in Burma, linking up with existing railways at both places. Its route was through Three Pagodas Pass on the border of Thailand and Burma.  of the railway were in Burma and the remaining  were in Thailand. The movement of POWs northward from Changi Prison in Singapore and other prison camps in Southeast Asia began in May 1942. On 23 June 1942, 600 British soldiers arrived at Camp Nong Pladuk, Thailand to build a camp to serve as a transit camp for the work camps along the railway. After preliminary work of airfields and infrastructure, construction of the railway began in Burma and Thailand on 16 September 1942. The projected completion date was December 1943. Much of the construction materials, including tracks and sleepers, were brought from dismantled branches of Malaya's Federated Malay States Railway network and the East Indies' various rail networks.

The railway was completed ahead of schedule. On 17 October 1943, construction gangs originating in Burma working south met up with construction gangs originating in Thailand working north. A holiday was declared for 25 October which was chosen as the ceremonial opening of the line. The Japanese staff would travel by train C56 31 from Nong Pladuk, Thailand to Thanbyuzayat, Burma. A copper spike was driven at the meeting point by commanding General Eiguma Ishida, and a memorial plaque was revealed.

As an American engineer said after viewing the project, "What makes this an engineering feat is the totality of it, the accumulation of factors. The total length of miles, the total number of bridgesover 600, including six to eight long-span bridgesthe total number of people who were involved (one-quarter of a million), the very short time in which they managed to accomplish it, and the extreme conditions they accomplished it under. They had very little transportation to get stuff to and from the workers, they had almost no medication, they couldn’t get food let alone materials, they had no tools to work with except for basic things like spades and hammers, and they worked in extremely difficult conditionsin the jungle with its heat and humidity. All of that makes this railway an extraordinary accomplishment."

The Japanese Army transported 500,000 tonnes of freight over the railway before it fell into Allied hands.

Post-war 
On 16 January 1946, the British ordered Japanese POWs to remove a four kilometre stretch of rail between Nikki (Ni Thea) and Sonkrai. The railway link between Thailand and Burma was to be separated again for protecting British interests in Singapore. After that, the Burma section of the railway was sequentially removed, the rails were gathered in Mawlamyine, and the roadbed was returned to the jungle. 

In October 1946, the Thai section of the line was sold to the Government of Thailand for £1,250,000 (50 million baht). The money was used to compensate neighbouring countries and colonies for material stolen by Japan during the construction of the railway. On 1 February 1947, two people including Momluang , the Thai Minister of Transport, were killed on an inspection tour because the bridge near Konkoita had collapsed. After the accident, it was decided to end the line at Nam Tok and reuse the remainder to rehabilitate the line.

After the war the railway was in poor condition and needed reconstruction for use by the Royal Thai Railway system. On 24 June 1949, the portion from Kanchanaburi to Nong Pla Duk (Thai หนองปลาดุก) was finished; on the first of April 1952, the next section up to Wang Pho (Wangpo) was done. The two curved spans of the bridge which collapsed due to the British air attack were replaced by angular truss spans provided by Japan as part of their postwar reparations, thus forming the iconic bridge now seen today. The line was abandoned beyond Nam Tok Sai Yok Noi; the steel rails were salvaged for reuse in expanding the Bang Sue railway yard, reinforcing the Bangkok–Ban Phachi Junction double track, rehabilitating the track from Thung Song Junction to Trang, and constructing both the Nong Pla Duk–Suphan Buri and Ban Thung Pho–Khiri Rat Nikhom branch lines. Parts of the abandoned route have been converted into a walking trail.

Since the 1990s various proposals have been made to rebuild the complete railway, but  these plans had not been realised. Since the upper part of the Khwae valley is now flooded by the Vajiralongkorn Dam, and the surrounding terrain is mountainous, it would take extensive tunnelling to reconnect Thailand with Burma by rail.

Labourers

Japanese
Japanese soldiers, 12,000 of them, including 800 Koreans, were employed on the railway as engineers, guards, and supervisors of the POW and rōmusha labourers. Although working conditions were far better for the Japanese than the POWs and rōmusha workers, about 1,000 (eight percent) of them died during construction. Many remember Japanese soldiers as being cruel and indifferent to the fate of Allied prisoners of war and the Asian rōmusha. Many men in the railway workforce bore the brunt of pitiless or uncaring guards. Cruelty could take different forms, from extreme violence and torture to minor acts of physical punishment, humiliation, and neglect.

Civilian labourers
The number of Southeast Asian workers recruited or impressed to work on the Burma railway has been estimated to have been more than 180,000 Southeast Asian civilian labourers (rōmusha). Javanese, Malayan Tamils of Indian origin, Burmese, Chinese, Thai, and other Southeast Asians, forcibly drafted by the Imperial Japanese Army to work on the railway, died in its construction. During the initial stages of the construction of the railway, Burmese and Thais were employed in their respective countries, but Thai workers, in particular, were likely to abscond from the project and the number of Burmese workers recruited was insufficient. The Burmese had welcomed the invasion by Japan and cooperated with Japan in recruiting workers.

In early 1943, the Japanese advertised for workers in Malaya, Singapore, and the Dutch East Indies, promising good wages, short contracts, and housing for families. When that failed to attract sufficient workers, they resorted to more coercive methods, rounding up workers and impressing them, especially in Malaya. Approximately 90,000 Burmese and 75,000 Malayans worked on the railroad. Other nationalities and ethnic groups working on the railway were Tamils, Chinese, Karen, Javanese, and Singaporean Chinese. Other documents suggest that more than 100,000 Malayan Tamils were brought into the project and around 60,000 perished.

Some workers were attracted by the relatively high wages, but the working conditions for the rōmusha were deadly. British doctor Robert Hardie wrote:

Prisoners of war
The first prisoners of war, 3,000 Australians, to go to Burma left Changi Prison in Singapore on 14 May 1942 and journeyed by sea to near Thanbyuzayat (သံဖြူဇရပ် in the Burmese language; in English 'Tin Shelter'), the northern terminus of the railway. They worked on airfields and other infrastructure initially before beginning construction of the railway in October 1942. The first prisoners of war to work in Thailand, 3,000 British soldiers, left Changi by train in June 1942 to Ban Pong, the southern terminus of the railway. More prisoners of war were imported from Singapore and the Dutch East Indies as construction advanced. Construction camps housing at least 1,000 workers each were established every 5–10 miles (8–17 km) of the route. Workers were moved up and down the railway line as needed.

The construction camps consisted of open-sided barracks built of bamboo poles with thatched roofs. Two hundred men were housed in each barracks, giving each man a two-foot wide space in which to live and sleep. Camps were usually named after the kilometre where they were located.

Atrocities

Conditions during construction

The prisoners of war "found themselves at the bottom of a social system that was harsh, punitive, fanatical, and often deadly." The living and working conditions on the Burma Railway were often described as "horrific", with maltreatment, sickness, and starvation. The estimated number of civilian labourers and POWs who died during construction varies considerably, but the Australian Government figures suggest that of the 330,000 people who worked on the line (including 250,000 Asian labourers and 61,000 Allied POWs) about 90,000 of the labourers and about 16,000 Allied prisoners died.

Life in the POW camps was recorded at great risk by artists such as Jack Bridger Chalker, Philip Meninsky, John Mennie, Ashley George Old, and Ronald Searle. Human hair was often used for brushes, plant juices and blood for paint, and toilet paper as the "canvas". Some of their works were used as evidence in the trials of Japanese war criminals. Many are now held by the Australian War Memorial, State Library of Victoria, and the Imperial War Museum in London.

One of the earliest and most respected accounts is ex-POW John Coast's Railroad of Death, first published in 1946 and republished in a new edition in 2014. Coast's work is noted for its detail on the brutality of some Japanese and Korean guards as well as the humanity of others. It also describes the living and working conditions experienced by the POWs, together with the culture of the Thai towns and countryside that became many POWs' homes after leaving Singapore with the working parties sent to the railway. Coast also details the camaraderie, pastimes, and humour of the POWs in the face of adversity.

In his book Last Man Out, H. Robert Charles, an American Marine survivor of the sinking of the USS Houston, writes in depth about a Dutch doctor, Henri Hekking, a fellow POW who probably saved the lives of many who worked on the railway. In the foreword to Charles's book, James D. Hornfischer summarizes: "Dr. Henri Hekking was a tower of psychological and emotional strength, almost shamanic in his power to find and improvise medicines from the wild prison of the jungle". Hekking died in 1994. Charles died in December 2009.

Except for the worst months of the construction period, known as the "Speedo" (mid-spring to mid-October 1943), one of the ways the Allied POWs kept their spirits up was to ask one of the musicians in their midst to play his guitar or accordion, or lead them in a group sing-along, or request their camp comedians to tell some jokes or put on a skit.

After the railway was completed, the POWs still had almost two years to survive before liberation. During this time, most of the POWs were moved to hospital and relocation camps where they could be available for maintenance crews or sent to Japan to alleviate the manpower shortage there. In these camps entertainment flourished as an essential part of their rehabilitation. Theatres of bamboo and attap (palm fronds) were built, sets, lighting, costumes and makeup devised, and an array of entertainment produced that included music halls, variety shows, cabarets, plays, and musical comedieseven pantomimes. These activities engaged numerous POWs as actors, singers, musicians, designers, technicians, and female impersonators.

POWs and Asian workers were also used to build the Kra Isthmus Railway from Chumphon to Kra Buri, and the Sumatra or Palembang Railway from Pekanbaru to Muaro.

The construction of the Burma Railway is counted as a war crime committed by Japan in Asia.

After the completion of the railroad, over 10,000 POWs were then transported to Japan. Those left to maintain the line still suffered from appalling living conditions as well as increasing Allied air raids.

Death rates and causes 

In addition to malnutrition and physical abuse, malaria, cholera, dysentery and tropical ulcers were common contributing factors in the death of workers on the Burma Railway.

Estimates of deaths among Southeast Asian civilians subject to forced labour, often known as rōmusha, vary widely, because statistics are incomplete and fragmented. However, authorities agree that the percentage of deaths among the rōmusha was much higher than among the Allied military personnel. The total number of rōmusha working on the railway may have reached 300,000 and according to some estimates, the death rate among them was as high as 50 percent. The labourers that suffered the highest casualties were Burmese and Indian Tamils from Malaysia and Myanmar, as well as many Javanese.

A lower death rate among Dutch POWs and internees, relative to those from the UK and Australia, has been linked to the fact that many personnel and civilians taken prisoner in the Dutch East Indies had been born there, were long-term residents and/or had Eurasian ancestry; they tended thus to be more resistant to tropical diseases and to be better acclimatized than other Western Allied personnel.

The quality of medical care received by different groups of prisoners varied enormously. One factor was that many European and US doctors had little experience with tropical diseases. For example, a group of 400 Dutch prisoners, which included three doctors with extensive tropical medicine experience, suffered no deaths at all. Another group, numbering 190 US personnel, to whom Lieutenant Henri Hekking, a Dutch medical officer with experience in the tropics was assigned, suffered only nine deaths. Another cohort of 450 US personnel suffered 100 deaths.

Weight loss among Allied officers who worked on construction was, on average, 9–14 kg (20–30 lb) less than that of enlisted personnel.

Workers in more isolated areas suffered a much higher death rate than did others.

War crimes trials 
At the end of World War II, 111 Japanese military officials were tried for war crimes for their brutality during the construction of the railway. Thirty-two of them were sentenced to death. The most important trial was against the general staff. Lieutenant General Eiguma Ishida, overall commander of the Burma Railway, was sentenced to 10 years imprisonment. His subordinates Colonel Shigeo Nakamura, Colonel Tamie Ishii and Lieutenant-Colonel Shoichi Yanagita were sentenced to death. Major Sotomatsu Chida was sentenced to 10 years imprisonment. Hiroshi Abe, a first lieutenant who supervised construction of the railway at Sonkrai where 600 British prisoners out of 1,600 died of cholera and other diseases, was sentenced to death, later commuted to life in prison, as a B/C class war criminal. He served 11 years. No compensation or reparations have been provided to Southeast Asian victims.

Notable structures

The bridge on the River Kwai

One of the most notable portions of the entire railway line is Bridge 277, the so-called "Bridge on the River Kwai", which was built over a stretch of the river that was then known as part of the Mae Klong River. The greater part of the Thai section of the river's route followed the valley of the Khwae Noi River (khwae, 'stream, river' or 'tributary'; noi, 'small'. Khwae was frequently mispronounced by non-Thai speakers as kwai, or 'buffalo' in Thai). This gave rise to the name of "River Kwai" in English. In 1960, because of discrepancies between facts and fiction, the portion of the Mae Klong which passes under the bridge was renamed the Khwae Yai (แควใหญ่ in the Thai language; in English, 'big tributary'). On 26 October 1942, British prisoners of war arrived at Tamarkan to construct the bridge. Initially, 1,000 prisoners worked on the bridge and were commanded by Colonel Philip Toosey. In February 1943, 1,000 Dutch prisoners of war were added to Tamarkan. An unknown number of Malayan workers were housed in a nearby camp.

The bridge was made famous by Pierre Boulle's novel The Bridge over the River Kwai and its film adaptation, The Bridge on the River Kwai. However, the film and book contain many historical inaccuracies, and should be considered works of fiction.

A first wooden railroad bridge over the Khwae Yai was finished in February 1943, which was soon accompanied by a more modern ferro-concrete bridge in June 1943, with both bridges running in a NNE–SSW direction across the river. The newer steel and concrete bridge was made up of eleven curved-truss bridge spans which the Japanese builders brought from Java in the Dutch East Indies in 1942. 
This is the bridge that still remains today. The wooden bridge was reused for pedestrians and cars. It was this Bridge 277 that was to be attacked with the help of one of the world's first examples of a precision-guided munition, the US VB-1 AZON MCLOS-guided 1,000 lb aerial ordnance, on 23 January 1945. Bad weather forced the cancellation of the mission and the AZON was never deployed against the bridge.

The two bridges were successfully bombed and damaged on 13 February 1945 by bomber aircraft from the Royal Air Force (RAF). Repairs were carried out by forced labour of POWs shortly after and by April the wooden railroad trestle bridge was back in operation. On 3 April, a second bombing raid, this time by Liberator heavy bombers of the U.S. Army Air Forces (USAAF), damaged the wooden railroad bridge once again. Repair work soon commenced afterwards and continued again and both bridges were operational again by the end of May. A second air-raid by the RAF on 24 June finally severely damaged and destroyed the railroad bridges, and put the entire railway line out of commission for the rest of the war. 

The new railway line did not fully connect with the Burmese railroad network as no railroad bridges were built which crossed the river between Moulmein and Martaban (the former on the river's southern bank and the latter to the opposite on the northern bank). Thus, ferries were needed as an alternative connecting system. A bridge was not built until the Thanlwin Bridge (carrying both regular road and railroad traffic) was constructed between 2000 and 2005.

Hellfire Pass 

Hellfire Pass in the Tenasserim Hills was a particularly difficult section of the line to build: it was the largest rock cutting on the railway, it was in a remote area and the workers lacked proper construction tools during building. The Australian, British, Dutch and other Allied prisoners of war, along with Chinese, Malay, and Tamil labourers, were required by the Japanese to complete the cutting. Sixty-nine men were beaten to death by Japanese guards in the twelve weeks it took to build the cutting, and many more died from cholera, dysentery, starvation, and exhaustion.

Significant bridges

Cemeteries and memorials

In 1946, the remains of most of the war dead were moved from former POW camps, burial grounds and lone graves along the rail line to official war cemeteries.

Three cemeteries maintained by the Commonwealth War Graves Commission (CWGC) contain the vast majority of Allied military personnel who died on the Burma Railway.

Kanchanaburi War Cemetery, in the city of Kanchanaburi, contains the graves of 6,982 personnel comprising:
 3,585 British
 1,896 Dutch
 1,362 Australians
 12 members of the Indian Army (including British officers)
 2 New Zealanders
 2 Danes
 8 Canadians

A memorial at the Kanchanaburi cemetery lists 11 other members of the Indian Army, who are buried in nearby Muslim cemeteries.

Thanbyuzayat War Cemetery, at Thanbyuzayat, 65 kilometres south of Moulmein, Myanmar (Burma) has the graves of 3,617 POWs who died on the Burmese portion of the line.
 1,651 British
 1,335 Australians
 621 Dutch
 15 Indian Army
 3 New Zealanders
1 Canadian

Chungkai War Cemetery, near Kanchanaburi, has a further 1,693 war graves.
 1,373 British
 314 Dutch
 6 Indian Army

The remains of United States personnel were repatriated. Of the 668 US personnel forced to work on the railway, 133 died. This included personnel from USS Houston and the 131st Field Artillery Regiment of the Texas Army National Guard. The Americans were called the Lost Battalion as their fate was unknown to the United States for more than two years after their capture.

Several museums are dedicated to those who perished building the railway. The largest of these is at Hellfire Pass (north of the current terminus at Nam Tok), a cutting where the greatest number of people died. An Australian memorial is at Hellfire Pass. One museum is in Myanmar side Thanbyuzayat, and two other museums are in Kanchanaburi: the Thailand–Burma Railway Centre, opened in January 2003, and the JEATH War Museum. There is a memorial plaque at the Kwai bridge itself, and an historic wartime steam locomotive is on display.

A preserved section of line has been rebuilt at the National Memorial Arboretum in England.

Notable labourers 

 Sir Harold Atcherley, businessman, public figure and arts administrator in the United Kingdom
 Idris James Barwick, author of In the Shadow of Death, died in 1974
 Theo Bot (1911–1984), Dutch politician and diplomat, government minister and ambassador
 Leo Britt, British theatrical producer in Chungkai, Kachu Mountain, and Nakhon Nai
 Sir John Carrick, Australian senator
 Norman Carter, Australian theatrical producer in Bicycle Camp, Java, in numerous camps on the Burma side of the construction, and later in Tamarkan, Thailand
 Jack Bridger Chalker, artist best known for his work recording the lives of prisoners of war in World War II
 Anthony Chenevix-Trench (1919–1979), headmaster of Eton College, 1964–1970 and Fettes College 1972–1979
 Sir Albert Coates, chief Australian medical officer on the railway
 John Coast (1916–1989), British writer and music promoter. He wrote one of the earliest and most respected POW memoirs, Railroad of Death (1946).
 Col. John Harold Henry Coombes, founder and the first Principal of Cadet College Petaro in Pakistan
 Sir Ernest Edward "Weary" Dunlop, Australian surgeon renowned for his leadership of POWs on the railway
 Ringer Edwards, Australian soldier who survived crucifixion at the hands of Japanese soldiers while working on the line
 Arch Flanagan (1915–2013), Australian soldier and father of novelist Richard Flanagan and Martin Flanagan
 Keith Flanagan (d. 2008) Australian soldier, journalist and campaigner for recognition of Weary Dunlop
 William Frankland, British immunologist whose achievements include the popularisation of the pollen count as a piece of weather-related information to the British public and the prediction of increased levels of allergy to penicillin
 Ernest Gordon, the former Presbyterian dean of the chapel at Princeton University
 R. M. Hare, philosopher
 Wim Kan, Dutch comedian and cabaret producer on the Burma side of the railway during the construction period and later in Nakhon Pathom Hospital Camp in Thailand
 Hamilton Lamb (1900–1943), Australian politician and member of the Victorian Legislative Assembly, died of illness and malnutrition at railway camp 131 Kilo in Thailand
 Eric Lomax, author of The Railway Man, an autobiography based on these events, which has been made into a film of the same name starring Colin Firth and Nicole Kidman
 Jacob Markowitz, Romanian-born Canadian physician (1901–1969), a.k.a. the "Jungle Surgeon", who enlisted with the RAMC 
 Tan Sri Professor Sir Alexander Oppenheim, British mathematician, started a POW university for his fellow workers
 Frank Pantridge, British physician
 Donald Purdie (d. 1943), British chemistry professor and department head at Raffles College, Singapore; Purdie died during construction of the railway
 Rowley Richards, Australian doctor who kept detailed notes of his time as a medical officer on the railway. He later wrote a book detailing his experiences
 Rohan Rivett, Australian war correspondent in Singapore; captured after travelling 700 km, predominantly by rowboat, from Singapore; Rivett spent three years working on the Burma railway and later wrote a book chronicling the events.
 Ronald Searle, British cartoonist, creator of the St Trinian's School characters
 E. W. Swanton (1907–2000), Cricket writer and broadcaster. Mentioned in his autobiography – Sort of a cricket person
 Arie Smit (1916–2016), Dutch artist and colonial army lithographer; captured in East Java by Japanese in March 1942, sent to Changi Prison and worked on Thai section of railway
 Philip Toosey, senior Allied officer at the Bridge on the River Kwai
 Reg Twigg (1913–2013), British author Survivor on the River Kwai: Life on the Burma Railway, Private in the Leicestershire Regiment
 Tom Uren, Deputy Leader of the Australian Labor Party; Minister for Urban and Regional Development in Whitlam government
 Alistair Urquhart, former Gordon Highlander, born in Aberdeen, Scotland. (1919–2016), author of the book The Forgotten Highlander in which he recalls how he survived his three years on the railway
 Ian Watt (1917–1999), literary critic, literary historian and professor of English at Stanford University
 David Neville Ffolkes (1912–1966), film and theatre set and costume designer. He won a Tony award in 1947 for his costumes for the play Henry VIII.

Cultural references
The construction of the railway has been the subject of a novel and an award-winning film, The Bridge on the River Kwai (itself an adaptation of the French language novel The Bridge over the River Kwai); a novel, The Narrow Road to the Deep North by Richard Flanagan, and a large number of personal accounts of POW experiences. More recently, the motion picture The Railway Man (based on the book of the same name) also gives insight into the barbaric conditions and suffering that were inflicted upon the workers who built the railway. Flanagan's 2013 book The Narrow Road to the Deep North centres on a group of Australian POWs and their experiences building the railway as slave labour, and was awarded the 2014 Man Booker Prize. The book Through the Valley of the Kwai and the 2001 film To End All Wars are an autobiography of British Army captain Ernest Gordon.

See also

 "Death Railway" (Spyforce episode)
 Far East prisoners of war
 Hellship
 Kra Isthmus Railway
 Military railways
 Siam–Burma Death Railway (film)
 Slavery in Japan
 Strategic railway
 Sumatra Railway

Notes

References

Sources

External links 

 The Prisoner List. Short online film about prisoners of the Japanese during World War II. Depicts life on the Burma Railway.
 Burma railway trip report 2012
 Captive Audiences/Captive Performers: Music and Theatre as Strategies for Survival on the Thailand-Burma Railway 1942–1945
 Works of Ashley George Old held by the State Library of Victoria
 Australian Government death statistics
 Allied POWS under Japanese for reference only
 2/3rd Machine Gun Battalion AIF for reference only
 TourismThailand
 EAN
 Prisoner of War FX Larkin NX43393 AIF – Detailed web site with documentation and photographs relating to the POW experiences of Frank Larkin in Malaya, Singapore, Thailand and Japan.
 Articles on the Australian medical personnel working on the railway. Also sketches by POWs.
 The Will to Live , by Len (Snowie) Baynes, a first-hand account of working on the Railway.
 Kanchanaburi War Cemetery CWGC for reference only
 Kanchanaburi Memorial CWGC for reference only
 Chungkai War Cemetery CWGC for reference only
 Thanbyuzayat War Cemetery CWGC for reference only
 Death Railway list for redress for reference only
 Construction of the Burma Railway

 
Myanmar–Thailand relations
History of rail transport in Thailand
Japanese prisoner of war and internment camps
Japanese war crimes
Metre gauge railways in Myanmar
Logistics routes of World War II
Railway lines in Thailand
South-East Asian theatre of World War II
Thailand in World War II
Strategic railways
Tourist attractions in Thailand
World War II sites in Burma
Railway lines opened in 1943
Railway lines closed in 1947
Railway lines opened in 1957